Charles Tidwell (March 30, 1937 – August 28, 1969) was an American track athlete who was one of the best sprinter/hurdlers in the world in the years 1958–60. He was denied a chance to run in the 1960 Olympics by injury.

His life was cut short aged 32 when he shot himself to death after killing his wife following a violent quarrel between the two.

Track career 

Tidwell was a native of Independence, Kansas, where he was a star athlete at his high school. The highlight was a national junior record for the 180 y low hurdles in 1955. After graduating high school he attended the University of Kansas.

Tidwell was an outstanding sprinter for his college track team, the Kansas Jayhawks, winning five NCAA individual titles:
100 y in 1959-60 (he was also 2nd in 1958) 
220 y in 1960
220 y hurdles in 1958 (he was also 2nd in 1959) 
so helping the team win back-to-back NCAA team titles in 1959 and 1960. In the 1958 NCAA championships, Tidwell set a world best time in the 220 y hurdles.

Tidwell also won the Kansas Relays 100 y race in 1959 and 1960, winning Athlete of the Meet in 1959, and for this was honored as an inductee in the Kansas Relays Hall of Fame in 2005.

Tidwell's form meant he was one of the favorites to going into the United States Olympic Trials to qualify for the 100 and 200 m at the 1960 Rome Olympics. However, an injury suffered at the trials ruined his qualification chances. Tidwell had qualified first in his heat for the final of the 100 m. In the final, Tidwell had one false start. When the race finally got underway a pulled muscle at 50 m prematurely ended his race. The injury forced him to scratch from the 200 m trial event.

Tidwell achieved five world best times during his career - none were ratified as world records by the IAAF:
 on 14 June 1958 in Berkeley, California,  he ran the 220 y hurdles in a new record time of 22.7 s. The 220 y hurdles event was not officially recognized by the IAAF.
 on 16 May 1959 in Norman, Oklahoma, he equalled his time of 22.7 s for the 220 y hurdles. The 220 y hurdles event was not officially recognized by the IAAF.
 on 20 June 1959 in Boulder, Colorado, he ran the 200 m hurdles in a new record time of 22.6 s. The 200 m hurdles event was not officially recognized by the IAAF.
 on 16 April 1960 in Abilene, Texas, he ran a 220 yards race in 20.2 s - the course was found to be short at 218 y 10" (199.60 m). Adding another 0.1 s for the missing distance to 200 m gives a time of 20.3 s when the then world record for that distance was 20.5 s!
 on 10 June 1960 in Houston, Texas, he equalled the then world record for the 100 m with a time of 10.1 s. Armin Hary ran a new world record of 10.0 s on 21 June.

American Football career 

In 1962, Tidwell tried out with the National Football League team the Minnesota Vikings. However, his try out was unsuccessful and he was cut from the squad later that year.

Later life 

In August 1969, Tidwell was involved in a domestic tragedy that led to the death of both himself and his estranged wife, Karen.

Reports state that he shot his wife at the house of one of her neighbors, then turned the gun on himself after a violent quarrel. The incident took place in Denver, Colorado where Tidwell and his wife were living at the time.

Rankings

Tidwell was ranked among the best in the US and the world in both the 100 m/100 y and 200 m/220 y sprint events in 1959 and 1960, according to the votes of the experts of Track & Field News.

References

1937 births
1969 suicides
People from Independence, Kansas
Track and field athletes from Kansas
American male sprinters
American male hurdlers
World record setters in athletics (track and field)
Kansas Jayhawks men's track and field athletes
Suicides by firearm in Colorado
Murder–suicides in Colorado
1969 murders in the United States
American murderers